Nina Belikova (born 19 December 1961) is a Russian former long-distance runner. She was the bronze medallist at the 1995 European Cross Country Championships and led a Russian team including Alla Zhilyaeva and Yelena Baranova to the women's team title.

She was also a member of the Russian team for the IAAF World Cross Country Championships in 1994 and 1995. She helped the Russian women to fourth at the former edition, finishing 22nd, but fell down to 71st on her second appearance.

International competitions

References

External links

All Athletics profile

Living people
1961 births
Russian female long-distance runners
Russian female cross country runners